Crooked Timber is a left-of-centre political blog run by a group of (mostly) academics from and working in several different nations, including the United States, the United Kingdom, the Republic of Ireland, Australia and Singapore. The name alludes to an English translation of a quotation by Immanuel Kant:  from  his essay "Idea for a Universal History with a Cosmopolitan Purpose" (1784).

History 

Crooked Timber was founded in July 2003 as a merger of several individual blogs, including Junius and Gallowglass, along with some new contributors. Additional members were added over subsequent months until the group reached an agreed optimum of 15 members.

Crooked Timber ranked in Technorati's Top 100 blogs between 2003 and 2005 and is still widely linked to in the academic blogosphere. On March 9, 2008, it was listed as number 33 in The Guardian's list of the world's 50 most important blogs. On April 15, 2011, an article on academic blogs in The New York Times listed Crooked Timber as one of seven influential examples of the type, describing it as having "built a reputation as an intellectual global powerhouse".

The quotation "Out of the crooked timber of humanity no straight thing was ever made" (Aus so krummem Holze, als woraus der Mensch gemacht ist, kann nichts ganz Gerades gezimmert werden) is from Kant's Idea for a Universal History with a Cosmopolitan Purpose. The liberal philosopher Isaiah Berlin alluded to the quotation in The Crooked Timber of Humanity: Chapters in the History of Ideas.

Crooked Timber has held several online book events, during which a subset of members (and often also invited guestbloggers) read a book and each write a blog post about it, either a review or a post inspired by the book.

Current members

Former members

References

External links 
 

Philosophical literature
Political blogs
Economics websites